The Royal Naval College was the service academy of the Royal Netherlands Navy. It offers a program of four or five years and also a short course of 16 to 22 months. Upon the completion of the program a graduate is awarded a bachelor's degree and is commissioned in the Royal Netherlands Navy. The training of officers for the Royal Netherlands Army and Royal Netherlands Air Force is done by the Koninklijke Militaire Academie in Breda.

History 
The Royal Netherlands Navy was officially founded in 1815, but existed in various forms since 1488. In the early years of the Navy, officers were trained in service aboard ships. In 1785, the 'Kweekschool voor de Zeevaart' the first land-based training school for future officers, opened. This school was the predecessor of the KIM. During the time of the Batavian Republic (1795–1806), as the Dutch Navy began to become more organized, the training school was improved as well. With the forming of the Kingdom of the Netherlands on 10 January 1816, an institute for training naval officers was founded in Delft. Twelve years later, it was moved to a site near Medemblik, and many improvements were made for the move. A boarding school system was introduced, and the institute applied for officer training. On 28 August 1829, the opening of the institute was celebrated in the great church of Medemblik. That date is now observed as the anniversary of KIM's founding. In 1854, the current campus at Willemsoord in Den Helder was opened. In 2005 the academy was incorporated in the newly founded 'Nederlandse Defensie Academy' (NLDA), which was followed by the arrival of a lot of army and air force cadets in technical studies, and the transfer of midshipmen that followed non-technical studies to Breda, effectively ending its role as a 'maritime' academy.

Alumni
Piet de Jong '34, former Prime Minister of The Netherlands (1967–1971)
Eugène Lacomblé '17, posthumous recipient of the Military William Order
Hans Larive, escapee from Colditz, recipient of the Military William Order

Ranks

References

External links

Official website in Dutch

Naval education and training in the Netherlands
Defunct military academies
Educational institutions established in 1829
Military academies of the Netherlands
Naval academies
Organisations based in the Netherlands with royal patronage
Den Helder
1829 establishments in the Netherlands